Stephen Malik is the owner and chairman of North Carolina FC of United Soccer League and North Carolina Courage of National Women's Soccer League. He is also the founder & executive chairman of Medfusion.

References

Year of birth missing (living people)
Living people
North Carolina FC
North Carolina Courage owners